The Samsung SGH-i600 is a smartphone running Windows Mobile 5 Smartphone Edition or Windows Mobile 6.0 Standard Edition, featuring HSDPA, Wi-Fi, and Bluetooth connectivity.

It is similar in design to the Samsung Blackjack (SGH-i607), which is available in the United States on the AT&T network. The SGH-i600 is available through service providers in Europe, but only SIM-free in the U.S. It has a MicroSD memory card expansion port which accepts up to 2Gb cards.

Features include a 2.3 inch screen with a resolution of 320 x 240 and 65k colors. It also contains a 1.3 megapixel digital camera, with a small curved mirror for self-portraits.

Specifications
Specifications from the Samsung website:

 Screen size: 2.3 inches
 Screen resolution: 320 x 240 pixels
 Input method: QWERTY/AZERTY Keyboard and thumb-wheel
 Operating System: Windows Mobile 5.0 (upgrade to 6 was available until 31 October 2008)
 Processor: 220 MHz Texas Instruments OMAP 1710
 Storage: External microSD slot
 Flash Memory: 128 MB RAM, 128 MB ROM
 Modes: Tri-band GSM 900, 1800, and 1900
 Data connection: 3G (HSDPA) and 2G (EDGE and GPRS)
 Wi-Fi 802.11 b/g
 Bluetooth 2.0 (A2DP, AVRCP)
 USB 1.1
 1.3 megapixel camera that can take photographs and videos
 2X digital zoom
 Self timer
 Multi shot
 Brightness level adjustment
 Video playback:  H.263, H.264, MP4, WMV
 Audio playback:  MP3, AAC, AAC+, WMA, WAV
 Battery: Removable 3.7 Volt Lithium-ion, 1,200 mAh
 Talk time: GSM 4.75 hours, WCDMA 2.5 hours
 Standby: GSM 380 hours, WCDMA 345 hours
 Size: 113 x 59 x 11.8 mm
 Weight: 105 grams

References

External links
 Official Samsung SGH-i600 web page
 Reviews: msmobiles, CNET Asia, Mobile-review

I600
Windows Mobile Standard devices
Mobile phones introduced in 2007